The following is a list of awards won by country-pop singer Anne Murray. Anne Murray is the winner of four Grammy Awards (including one in the pop category), three CMA Awards, and also has countless Juno Awards, American Music Awards, etc.

Awards by year

1971
RPM Awards - Best Produced Single: "Snowbird"
RPM Awards - Best Produced MOR Album: Honey, Wheat & Laughter

1972
RPM Awards - Female Vocalist of the Year
RPM Awards - Best Produced MOR Album: Talk It Over in the Morning

1973 
RPM Awards - Female Vocalist of the Year
RPM Awards - Best Produced MOR Album: Brian Ahern: Annie
ACTRA Award - Best Variety Performance: Straight, Clean and Simple

1974
RPM Awards - Female Vocalist of the Year
RPM Awards - Pop Music Album of the Year: Danny's Song
Grammy Award - Best Country Vocal Performance: "Love Song"
Country Music Association of Great Britain Awards - Country Female Vocalist of the Year

1975
Juno Award - Female Vocalist of the Year
Juno Award - Country Female Vocalist of the Year

1976
Juno Award - Country Female Vocalist of the Year

1978
Grammy Award - Best Pop Vocal: "You Needed Me"
Academy of Country Music - Song of the Year: "You Needed Me"

1979
Juno Award - Female Vocalist of the Year
Juno Award - Children's Album of the Year: There's a Hippo in My Tub
Juno Award - Recording Engineer: Let's Keep It That Way
RPM Big Country Awards - Top Country Female Singer
RPM Big Country Awards - Canadian Country Artist of the Year

1980
Grammy Award - Best Country Vocal Performance: "Could I Have This Dance"
Juno Award - Female Vocalist of the Year
Juno Award - Country Female Vocalist of the Year
Juno Award - Album of the Year: New Kind of Feeling
Juno Award - Single of the Year: "I Just Fall in Love Again"
RPM Big Country Awards - Best Country Album: I'll Always Love You

1981
Juno Award - Female Vocalist of the Year
Juno Award - Country Female Vocalist of the Year
Juno Award - Album of the Year: Greatest Hits
Juno Award - Single of the Year: "Could I Have This Dance"

1982
American Music Awards - Female Country Singer
Juno Award - Female Vocalist of the Year
Juno Award - Country Female Vocalist of the Year

1983
Grammy Award - Best Country Vocal Performance: "A Little Good News"
Juno Award - Country Female Vocalist of the Year

1984
Juno Award - Country Female Vocalist of the Year
Canadian Country Music Association - Single of the Year: "A Little Good News"
Country Music Association - Single of the Year: "A Little Good News"
Country Music Association - Album of the Year: A Little Good News

1985
American Music Awards - Favorite Country Video Single: "A Little Good News"
American Music Awards - Favorite Country Female Video Artist
Juno Award - Country Female Vocalist of the Year
Country Music Association - Vocal Duo of the Year: Anne Murray and Dave Loggins 
RPM Big Country Awards - Top Country Female Vocalist
RPM Big Country Awards - Best Country Single: "Nobody Loves Me Like You Do" (with Dave Loggins)

1986
Juno Award - Country Female Vocalist of the Year
Canadian Country Music Association - Single of the Year:  "Now and Forever (You and Me)"
Canadian Country Music Association - Song of the Year: "Now and Forever (You and Me)"
RPM Big Country Awards - Top Country Female Vocalist

1987
RPM Big Country Awards - Top Country Female Vocalist
RPM Big Country Awards - Best Country Single: "Now and Forever (You and Me)"

1988
RPM Big Country Awards - Top Country Female Vocalist

1990
East Coast Music Awards - Video of the Year: "If I Ever Fall in Love Again" (with Kenny Rogers)

1993
Gemini Awards - Best Performance in a Variety Show: Country Gold

Other achievements
1975 - Officer of the Order of Canada
1975 - Country Music Hall of Fame Walkway of Stars
1976 - Honorary Doctor of Letters from University of New Brunswick
1978 - Honorary Doctor of Letters from Saint Mary's University
1980 - Star on the Hollywood Walk of Fame at 1750 Vine Street
1984 - Companion Of The Order Of Canada
1993 - Induction into the Canadian Music Hall of Fame
1995 - Governor General's Performing Arts Award
1997 - Canadian Association of Broadcasters Hall of Fame Award
1998 - Star on Canada's Walk of Fame
2001 - East Coast Music Association Director's Special Achievement Award
2002 - Induction into the Canadian Country Music Association Hall of Fame
2002 - Awarded the Order of Nova Scotia 
2002 - Honorary Canadian Tourism Ambassador
2002 - Resorts' Entrance to the Stars on the Boardwalk, Atlantic City, NJ
2002 - Ranked #24 on CMT's 40 Greatest Women in Country Music
2006 - Canadian Songwriters Hall of Fame Award
2007 - Likeness of Anne Murray featured on Canada Post stamp 
2008 - Howie Richmond Hitmaker Award 
2009 - Honorary degree from the University of Prince Edward Island.

Murray, Anne